KSCB-FM is a radio station airing a hot adult contemporary format licensed to Liberal, Kansas, broadcasting on 107.5 MHz FM.  The station is owned by Seward County Broadcasting Co., Inc.

References

External links
KSCB-FM's official website

Hot adult contemporary radio stations in the United States
SCB-FM
Liberal, Kansas